Brigadier Frederick Arthur Stanley Clarke DSO (3 October 1892 – 3 January 1972) was a British Army officer who served in both World Wars.

He was educated at Loughborough Grammar School.  He joined the British Army as a 2nd Lt in 1912. During the First World War he served in Gallipoli, Egypt, Palestine and India, achieving the rank of Major and in 1918 being awarded the Distinguished Service Order.  He continued his army career during the interbellum. During the Second World War he served in France, West Africa, North Africa and Italy.  He retired in 1947.

Works
 The History of the West African Frontier Force (Gale and Polden, Aldershot, 1964), Col A Haywood and Clarke.

References 

 CLARKE, Brig. Frederick Arthur Stanley', Who Was Who, A & C Black, 1920–2008; online edn, Oxford University Press, Dec 2007 Retrieved 30 April 2011
 http://www.aim25.ac.uk/cgi-bin/vcdf/detail?coll_id=373&inst_id=21
Generals of World War II

1892 births
1972 deaths
People educated at Loughborough Grammar School
Companions of the Distinguished Service Order
London Regiment officers
Essex Regiment officers
British military personnel of the Irish War of Independence
British Army personnel of World War I
British Army brigadiers of World War II
Royal West African Frontier Force officers